William Parsons may refer to:

William Parsons (composer and copyist) (fl.1545–1563), English Renaissance composer and copyist from Wells

William Parsons (composer and musician) (1745/6–1817), Master of the King's Music
William Parsons (poet) (died 1828), English writer associated with the Della Cruscan movement
William Barclay Parsons (1859–1932), American civil engineer
William E. Parsons (1872–1939), American architect and city planner
William Sterling Parsons (1901–1953), American naval officer and atomic bomb weaponeer aboard Enola Gay
William W. Parsons (academic administrator) (1850–1925), president of Indiana State Normal School, later known as Ball State University
William W. Parsons (NASA), former director of the NASA John F. Kennedy Space Center, & Space Shuttle Program manager
William Henry Parsons (New York activist) (died 1935), headed the New York Society for the Suppression of Vice
William Henry Parsons (colonel) (1826–1907), American newspaper editor, legislator, and Confederate colonel
William Parsons (actor) (1736–1795), British actor and painter
William Parsons (silent film actor) (1878–1919), American silent comedy film actor often credited as "Smiling Bill Parsons"
Bill Parsons (born 1948), baseball player
Sir William Parsons, 1st Baronet of Langley (c.1636–c.1662), of the Parsons baronets
Sir William Parsons, 1st Baronet of Bellamont (died 1650), Surveyor General of Ireland and Member of Parliament 
Sir William Parsons, 2nd Baronet of Bellamont (died 1658), Earl of Rosse
Sir William Parsons, 2nd Baronet of Birr Castle (died 1741), Earl of Rosse
Sir William Parsons, 4th Baronet of Birr Castle (1731–1791), Irish politician
William Parsons, 3rd Earl of Rosse (1800–1867), Lord Rosse, Irish astronomer
William Parsons, 5th Earl of Rosse (1873–1918), Irish peer and British Army officer
William Parsons, 7th Earl of Rosse (born 1936), worked for the United Nations